The 1914 Nebraska gubernatorial election was held on November 3, 1914.

Incumbent Democratic Governor John H. Morehead defeated Republican nominee Robert B. Howell with 50.36% of the vote.

Primary elections
Primary elections were held on August 18, 1914.

Democratic primary

Candidates
George W. Berge, Fusion candidate for Governor in 1904
Richard Lee Metcalfe, former Military Governor of the Panama Canal Zone
John H. Morehead, incumbent Governor

Results

People's Independent primary

Candidates
George W. Berge, Fusion candidate for Governor in 1904
John H. Morehead, incumbent Governor

Results

Progressive primary

Candidates
Harry E. Sackett, attorney, former State Senator

Withdrew
Arthur Wray, judge

Results

Prohibition primary

Candidates
Nathan Wilson, Prohibition candidate for Governor in 1912

Results

Republican primary

Candidates
John Ceplecha
Robert B. Howell, former State Senator
Ross L. Hammond, newspaper editor
James Harvey Kemp, State Senator
John Stevens
John O. Yeiser, member of the State Board of Pardons

Results

Socialist primary

Candidates
George C. Porter, Socialist candidate for Nebraska's 2nd congressional district in 1908

Results

General election

Candidates
Major party candidates
John H. Morehead, Democratic and People's Independent
Robert B. Howell, Republican

Other candidates
Harry E. Sackett, Progressive
Nathan Wilson, Prohibition
George C. Porter, Socialist

Results

Notes

References

Bibliography
 

1914
Nebraska
Gubernatorial